Terezinha Guilhermina (born 3 October 1978) is a Paralympic athlete from Brazil competing mainly in category T11 sprint events, T11 being the category for totally blind athletes. She has congenital retinitis pigmentosa, as do five of her twelve brothers.

She competed in the 2004 Summer Paralympics in Athens, Greece. There she won a bronze medal in the women's 400 metres – T12 event, went out in the first round of the women's 800 metres – T12 event and finished seventh in the women's 1500 metres – T12 event. She also competed at the 2008 Summer Paralympics in Beijing, China. There she won a gold medal in the women's 200 metres – T11 event, a silver medal in the women's 100 metres – T11 event and a bronze medal in the women's 400 metres – T11 event. In London 2012, she won two gold medals. In Rio 2016, she won silver in the women's 4 × 100 m relay - T11-13 and bronze in the women's 400m - T11. She was disqualified from the 200m T11 and 100m T11 after a false start. Her guide runner in Rio was Rafael Lazarini.

References

External links

 
 
 
 
 

1978 births
Living people
Brazilian female sprinters
Visually impaired sprinters
Visually impaired category Paralympic competitors
Paralympic athletes of Brazil
Paralympic gold medalists for Brazil
Paralympic silver medalists for Brazil
Paralympic bronze medalists for Brazil
Paralympic medalists in athletics (track and field)
Athletes (track and field) at the 2004 Summer Paralympics
Athletes (track and field) at the 2008 Summer Paralympics
Athletes (track and field) at the 2012 Summer Paralympics
Athletes (track and field) at the 2016 Summer Paralympics
Medalists at the 2004 Summer Paralympics
Medalists at the 2008 Summer Paralympics
Medalists at the 2012 Summer Paralympics
Medalists at the 2016 Summer Paralympics
World record holders in Paralympic athletics
Medalists at the 2007 Parapan American Games
Medalists at the 2011 Parapan American Games
Medalists at the 2015 Parapan American Games
Brazilian blind people